Amirhossein Esmaeilzadeh (born January 25, 2000) is an Iranian footballer who plays for Nassaji Mazandaran in the Persian Gulf Pro League.

Club career

Pars Jonoubi
He made his debut for Pars Jonoubi in 11th fixture of 2019–20 Persian Gulf Pro League against Paykan while he substituted in for Pouria Aria Kia.

References

External links
 

2000 births
Living people
People from Amol
Iranian footballers
Association football defenders
Paykan F.C. players
Esteghlal F.C. players
Pars Jonoubi Jam players
Nassaji Mazandaran players
Sportspeople from Mazandaran province